The Performing Animal Welfare Society (PAWS) is a U.S.-based group for abandoned or abused performing animals as well as victims of the exotic animal trade.  They claim 30,000 members. As a member accredited by The Association of Sanctuaries (TAOS), the society follows guidelines stipulated by TAOS, one of which is that none of the elephants be bred.

History
Founded by former Hollywood animal trainer and author Pat Derby and partner Ed Stewart, PAWS works to ensure that animals are protected by the Endangered Species and the Animal Welfare Acts, as well as by local laws. In 2007, with the arrival of a retired circus elephant named Nicholas, PAWS' ARK 2000 became the first sanctuary in the United States to house bull elephants. Today, the sanctuary is home to three bull elephants following the arrival of Sabu in September 2010, and Prince in July 2011. Sabu and Prince are both retired circus elephants.

Sanctuary Facilities

PAWS maintains three sanctuaries for captive wildlife—a 30 acre sanctuary in Galt, California, the  Amanda Blake Wildlife Refuge in Herald, California and a third, Ark 2000, which comprises  in San Andreas, California. The Galt sanctuary was the first in the United States equipped to care for elephants.

Ark 2000 is supported by private and corporate donations. Its membership list is said to have 33,000 names.

Animal Population

The sanctuaries currently house approximately six Asian elephants, five African elephants, 41 exotic cats such as tigers, lions, cougars, a black leopard, a serval, and a bobcat, eight bears (mostly American black bears), eight primates (mostly White-headed capuchins), one coyote, emu, rhea, fallow deer, eland, Muntjack deer and a herd of scimitar-horned oryx.

Ark 2000 houses two bears who appeared in the 1994 film Legends of the Fall: a grizzly bear named Tuffy and a Kodiak bear named Manfried.

See also 
Animal welfare
Animal rights
Animal protection

References

External links
 http://www.pawsweb.org

Animal charities based in the United States
Animal rescue groups
Animal sanctuaries
Charities based in California
Sacramento County, California
Calaveras County, California